Enrique E. Tarigo Vázquez (Montevideo, 15 September 1927 – 14 December 2002) was a Uruguayan jurist and political figure.

Background

He was a lawyer and University professor.

Vice President of Uruguay

He was Vice President of Uruguay from 1985 to 1990, in the first period of democratic government after the civilian-military administration of 1973–1985, serving under President Julio María Sanguinetti. A notable feature of his appointment to office was that the vice presidency had been vacant since the resignation of Vice President Jorge Sapelli in 1973. He served also the President of the Senate of Uruguay.
 
Tarigo was one of the most important persons in the movement to obtain the exit of the civilian-military government.

Succession

Tarigo was succeeded as vice president in 1990 by Gonzalo Aguirre.

Historical note

Tarigo was the ninth person to hold the office of Vice President of Uruguay. The office dates from 1934, when Alfredo Navarro became Uruguay's first vice president.

With Tarigo as running mate, Sanguinetti agreed to revive the office of vice president, despite the fact that the last Vice President of Uruguay had in practical terms caused the office to go into abeyance when he publicly repudiated sitting president Bordaberry (whom Sanguinetti had also served as a minister, and with whom he dissented on issues relating to the civilian-military government of 1973-1985).

Death
Tarigo died in 2002, victim of cancer.

See also
 Politics of Uruguay

References

External links

1927 births
2002 deaths
Uruguayan people of Italian descent
Vice presidents of Uruguay
Presidents of the Senate of Uruguay
Uruguayan vice-presidential candidates
Politicians from Montevideo
University of the Republic (Uruguay) alumni
Academic staff of the University of the Republic (Uruguay)
Uruguayan jurists
Ambassadors of Uruguay to Spain
Deaths from cancer in Uruguay